was a Japanese actor, tarento, and businessman. He was represented by the agency Pickles. His daughter is model and tarento Anna Umemiya.

The son of a doctor, Umemiya gave up a medical career to debut as a Toei New Face at the Toei Studios. As an actor, he appeared in films and television dramas and also in restaurant variety shows.

Umemiya died of kidney failure on 12 December 2019. He was 81 years old.

Filmography

TV series

Anime

Variety

Advertisements

Discography

Singles

Albums

References

External links

 

1938 births
2019 deaths
Japanese entertainers
Japanese businesspeople
Japanese chefs
Male actors from Harbin
20th-century Japanese male actors
21st-century Japanese male actors